Malik Sikandar Khan is a Pakistani politician who is the current Leader of the Opposition in and member of the Provincial Assembly of the Balochistan.

He previously has served as Speaker of Balochistan Assembly from 1990 to 1993.

References

Living people
Speakers of the Provincial Assembly of Balochistan
Muttahida Majlis-e-Amal politicians
Year of birth missing (living people)